Transformers '84: Secrets & Lies is an American comic book limited series written by Simon Furman, drawn by Guido Guidi and published by IDW Publishing. Based on the Transformers franchise by Hasbro, the series is meant to be a prequel to both the continuity established on the original comic book by Marvel Comics, and the other continuity established on the alternate comic book by Marvel UK.

Plot 

As the Cybertronian Civil War rages between Optimus Prime's Autobots and Megatron's Decepticons, Shockwave has encountered a new obstacle to the Decepticons' victory and subjugation of the planet: Megatron himself! As Optimus and his recruits take off to stop an even deadlier threat–an asteroid belt powerful enough to destroy the metal world–Megatron leads a team of Decepticons after in hot pursuit! But what other motivations does Prime have for this mission? How does it benefit Shockwave's goals? And what does it all have to do with a secret on Earth in the eleventh century?

The story is narrated from the viewpoint of Punch a.k.a. Counterpunch, an Autobot infiltrated as a Decepticon.

Publication history 
In 2019, IDW Publishing originally released the miniseries Transformers '84: Secrets & Lies miniseries written by veteran Transformers writer and co-creator Simon Furman, drawn by Guido Guidi and colored by John-Paul Bove.

The series a prequel to the original comic book series published by Marvel Comics, intended to be fuse its continuity with the alternate Marvel UK series.

Issues

Reception 
The initial issues received mostly positive reviews, with Ricky Church of Flickering Myth praising the writing and art, while Alexander Jones of Multiversity Comics says issue #0 is "a joyous exploration into the history of the Transformers." At ComicBook.com, Jamie Lovett wrote that as the series went on, it lost some of the charm it started with, feeling that it was a "love letter to the original Transformers comics" and "not meant to bring in new readers." Lovett gave high praise to the detailed artwork, which was true to the original comics.

Collected editions

References 

84 Secrets and Lies
Comics based on Hasbro toys
IDW Publishing titles